João Reynaldo Costa Lima Neto (born May 17, 1947 in Pernambuco) is a former international butterfly swimmer from Brazil.

At the 1967 Pan American Games, in Winnipeg, he won a bronze medal in the 4×100-metre medley.

At the 1968 Summer Olympics, in Mexico City, he swam the 100-metre butterfly and the 4×100-metre medley, not reaching the finals.

References

 
1947 births
Living people
Brazilian male butterfly swimmers
Swimmers at the 1967 Pan American Games
Swimmers at the 1968 Summer Olympics
Olympic swimmers of Brazil
Pan American Games bronze medalists for Brazil
Pan American Games medalists in swimming
Medalists at the 1967 Pan American Games
Sportspeople from Pernambuco
20th-century Brazilian people